Jean-Denis Girard (born January 15, 1967) is a Canadian politician in Quebec, who was elected to the National Assembly of Quebec in the 2014 election. He represents the electoral district of Trois-Rivières as a member of the Quebec Liberal Party.

Prior to his election to the legislature, he was the President of the Chamber of Commerce for Coeur-de-Québec.

Electoral Record

References

Living people
Members of the Executive Council of Quebec
People from Trois-Rivières
Quebec Liberal Party MNAs
21st-century Canadian politicians
1967 births